Idaho Leadership Academy was a Liberal Arts Public Charter School in Pingree, Idaho. It closed in 2008, as the result of low enrollment and related funding shortfalls.

References

Public high schools in Idaho
Schools in Bingham County, Idaho
Charter schools in Idaho
2002 establishments in Idaho